is a town in Okhotsk Subprefecture, Hokkaido, Japan.

As of May 1, 2017, the town had an estimated population of 5,029 and a population density of 18 persons per squared kilometre. The total area is 287.04 km2.

Climate

Mascots

They are appointed as mascots on October 3, 2013.
Hogaja is a pouch. He lives with his family in the Hogaja Koshimizu Hokuyo Factory. He is bright, energetic and lively but embarrassed and sloppy at the same time. He usually helps import potato starches and collects headbands. His birthday is July 1. His friend, who is a Hogaja rice cracker, usually rides him.
Denbo is a denpun dango. He makes denpun dango for a living. His eyes, nose and mouth (which are his charm points) resembled kidney beans. He wears an orange bandana with his personal mon and carris a spatula (which he can use it to cook food or use as a weapon). His favourite colours are orange, navy blue and brown. He is unveiled on July 28, 2013.

See also
 Hama-Koshimizu Station
 Yamubetsu Station

References

External links

Official Website 

Towns in Hokkaido